The West number is an empirical parameter used to characterize the performance of Stirling engines and other Stirling systems. It is very similar to the Beale number where a larger number indicates higher performance; however, the West number includes temperature compensation. The West number is often used to approximate of the power output of a Stirling engine. The average value is (0.25) for a wide variety of engines, although it may range up to (0.35), particularly for engines operating with a high temperature differential.

The West number may be defined as:

 

where:
 Wn is the West number 
 Wo is the power output of the engine (watts)
 P is the mean average gas pressure (Pa) or (MPa, if volume is in cm3)
 V is swept volume of the expansion space (m3, or cm³, if pressure is in MPa)
 f is the engine cycle frequency (Hz)
 TH is the absolute temperature of the expansion space or heater (kelvins)
 TK is the absolute temperature of the compression space or cooler (kelvins)
 Bn is the Beale number for an engine operating between temperatures TH and TK  

When the Beale number is known, but the West number is not known, it is possible to calculate it.  First calculate the West number at the temperatures TH and TK for which the Beale number is known, and then use the resulting West number to calculate output power for other temperatures.

To estimate the power output of a new engine design, nominal values are assumed for the West number, pressure, swept volume and frequency, and the power is calculated as follows:

For example, with an absolute temperature ratio of 2, the portion of the equation representing temperature correction equals 1/3. With a temperature ratio of 3, the temperature term is 1/2. This factor accounts for the difference between the West equation, and the Beale equation in which this temperature term is taken as a constant. Thus, the Beale number is typically in the range of 0.10 to 0.15, which is about 1/3 to 1/2 the value of the West number.

References

External links
 Stirling Engine Performance Calculator

Dimensionless numbers
Piston engines
Mechanical engineering